Cyberchase: Carnival Chaos is a 2003 computer game developed by Canadian studio Basis Applied Technology and published by The Learning Company, based on the edutainment TV series Cyberchase.

Gameplay
Similarly to Cyberchase: Castleblanca Quest, the game features: eight activities, video footage and full screen animation, tracking feature lets parents monitor progress, adventure and practice modes, and three levels of difficulty.

Critical reception
Common Sense Media gave the game a rating of 4/5 stars. The site wrote "Kid-testers were impressed by how the program turned everyday carnival games into fun, logical challenges. Because the games are easy to play but hard to win, kids jumped right in". USA Today wrote "Cyberchase Castleblanca Quest isn't nearly as good as Cyberchase Carnival Chaos".

References

Children's educational video games
Video games based on television series
Video games developed in Canada
2003 video games
MacOS games
Windows games
The Learning Company games